Heart's Content is an album by jazz guitarist Peter Bernstein.

Background
Bernstein and pianist Brad Mehldau had recorded together several times previously.

Music and recording
The album was recorded on December 14, 2002 in Brooklyn, New York. The other musicians chosen were bassist Larry Grenadier and drummer Bill Stewart.

Reception
The Penguin Guide to Jazz stated that the album is "almost sublime – unfussy, skilful, complex in tone". BBC Music Magazine commented that Bernstein's "fundamentally patient manner draws the listener in, in the conversational way of great post-bop music".

Track listing

Personnel
 Peter Bernstein – guitar
 Brad Mehldau – piano
 Larry Grenadier – bass
 Bill Stewart – drums

References

Criss Cross Jazz albums
Peter Bernstein albums
2003 albums